Gayla is a given name. Notable people with the name include:

Gayla Drake (born 1964), American guitarist and singer/songwriter
Gayla Earlene (born 1954), Inola,Oklahoma Christian country music recording artist and musician
Gayla Margolin, American psychologist 
Gayla Hendren McKenzie, American politician
Gayla Peevey (born 1943), child star from Ponca City, Oklahoma who sang "I Want a Hippopotamus for Christmas" (Columbia, 1953)
Gayla Reid (born 1945), Australian-born Canadian writer
Gayla Leigh Shoemake (born 1941), pageant titleholder from El Dorado, Kansas who competed in the Miss America pageant in 1960
Gayla Trail, (born 1973), Canadian writer, gardener, designer, photographer, and blogger